Cristina Pantoja-Hidalgo (born Cristina Pantoja on 21 August 1944) is a Filipina fictionist, critic and pioneering writer of creative nonfiction. She is currently Professor Emeritus of English & Comparative Literature at the University of the Philippines Diliman and Director of the University of Santo Tomas (UST) Center for Creative Writing and Literary Studies.

Academic career
Pantoja-Hidalgo is a high school valedictorian of St. Paul College Quezon City. She received both her Bachelor of Philosophy (Faculty of Philosophy and Letters) (1964) magna cum laude and MA in Literature (1967) meritissimo from the University of Santo Tomas. She later received a PhD in Comparative Literature from the University of the Philippines Diliman in 1993. She is a member of the Philippine Literary Arts Council (PLAC).

She previously served as the Vice President for Public Affairs of the University of the Philippines System, Director of the University of the Philippines Press and coordinator of the Creative Writing Program at the Department of English and Comparative Literature of the University of the Philippines Diliman. At UST, Pantoja-Hidalgo held the post of UST Publishing House Director.

Before and after her fifteen years abroad, Hidalgo was a teacher first at the University of Santo Tomas and later at the University of the Philippines. Completing the requirements for her doctoral degree on Comparative Literature, Hidalgo has found many opportunities to read Literary Theory as well as put these into practice in her own works. Hidalgo claimed that she had never considered herself a literary critic, but just the same, she found it useful to collect five of her critical essays in A Gentle Subversion: Essays on Philippine Fiction in English (1998).

Literary career
Pantoja-Hidalgo has been writing for Philippine newspapers and magazines since the age of fifteen. She has worked as a writer, editor and teacher in Thailand, Lebanon, Korea, Myanmar (Burma) and New York, United States. Her interesting lifestyle, the result of her husband's fifteen-year connection with UNICEF, is reflected in her writing. Pantoja-Hidalgo was originally best known for an unusual kind of autobiographical/travel writing, which includes Sojourns (1984), Skyscrapers, Celadon and Kimchi (1993), I Remember (1991) and The Path of the Heart (1994), "Passages: Travel Essays" (2007), "Looking for the Philippines" (2009), and "Travels With Tania" (2009). Pantoja-Hidalgo later won numerous prizes for her fiction, creative nonfiction, literary scholarship and edited anthologies. She has frequently published many of her creative and critical manuscripts in major publications in Finland, Korea, the Philippines, Thailand and the United States.

Besides travel essays, Hidalgo has published collections of personal essays, The Path of Heart (1994),Coming Home (1997) and "Stella and Other Friendly Ghosts" (2012). She has also edited several anthologies, like "Creative Nonfiction: A Reader" (2003, 2005), "The Children's Hour" (2007, 2008), "Sleepless in Manila: Funny Essays, Etc. on Insomnia by Insomniacs" (2003), "My Fair Maladies: Funny Essays and Poems on Various Ailments and Afflictions" (2005), and "Tales of Fantasy and Enchantment" (2008).

She has encouraged many aspiring writers' efforts by editing their works: Shaking the Family Tree (1998) and Why I Travel and Other Essays by Fourteen Women (2000) with Erlinda Panlilio. Hidalgo found the idea of writing short and simple initiation stories appealing. It reflects in her collection of short stories: Ballad of a Lost Season and Other Stories (1987), Tales for a Rainy Night (1993), Where Only the Moon Rages: Nine Tales (1994), Catch a Falling Star (1999) and the most recent one Sky Blue After The Rain: Selected Stories and Tales (2005).

Hidalgo's critical essays, which reflect her interest in fictional writing by Filipino women, serves a much-needed contribution to a developing body of feminist scholarship in the country today.

Novel: Recuerdo
Recuerdo is an epistolary novel which consists of messages sent through email. The messages are written by Amanda, a middle-aged widow, to her daughter Marisa, a university student. Amanda lives in Bangkok while Marisa is situated in Manila. Through these messages, Amanda manages to sort out her life and helps Marisa understand their family's past. Amanda often tells her own mother's (Isabel) stories in many of these letters.

This way of storytelling resulted to a "Dynasty in Cyberspace" against a backdrop that juxtaposes two entirely different cultures: the first being superstitious while the other sophisticated. The story aims in this way to provide readers a history with which to possibly relate to ---- as it discusses the complexity of life in a world where families share so much heritage and stories often unknown and untold.

Hidalgo espouses a particularly pragmatic stance on this particular novel. It is not rooted in realism nor does it have any attempt on realism ---- it is a romantic novel. Fellow writer Ophelia Dimalanta supports Hidalgo as she says in her review of "Recuerdo", that readers might have the tendency of commenting on "the contravening of some degree of verisimilitude in the narrating of the stories rendered through letters which come regularly and with such contrived continuity and incessantness." Clearly, Dimalanta's response is a way of reinforcing Hidalgo's claim of "Recuerdo" being a romantic novel.

Novel: A Book of Dreams
A novel all about dreams and their respective dreamers. A novel in which the characters live in their own dreams, in particular, those of Angela's. But before readers mistakenly take this for a postmodern novel, the book's blurb adds, "But for all its affinity to the postmodern pastiche, its plot is the traditional one of the search... the quest."

Works

Short fiction
 Ballad of a Lost Season, 1987;
 Tales for a Rainy Night, 1993 ;
 Where Only the Moon Rages, 1994;
 Catch a Falling Star, 1999
 Sky Blue After The Rain: Selected Stories and Tales, 2005

Novels
 Recuerdo, 1996;
 Book of Dreams, 2001

Essays / Creative Non-fiction
 Sojourns, 1984
 Five Years in a Forgotten Land: A Burmese Notebook, 1991
 I Remember...Travel Essays, 1992
 Skyscrapers, Celadon and Kimchi: A Korean Notebook, 1993;
 The Path of the Heart, 1994;
 Coming Home, 1998
 Passages: Travel Essays, 2007
 Looking for the Philippines, 2009
 Travels with Tania, 2009
 Six Sketches of Filipino Women Writers, 2011
 Stella and Other Friendly Ghosts,, 2012

Literary Criticism
 Woman Writing: Home and Exile in the Autobiographical Narratives of Filipino Women, 1994;
 A Gentle Subversion: Essays on Philippine Fiction, 1998
 Over a Cup of Ginger Tea: Conversations on the Narratives of Filipino Women Writers, 2006
 Fabulists and Chroniclers, 2008

Anthologies (as editor)
 Selections from Contemporary Philippine Literature in English, 1971
 Philippine Post-Colonial Studies, 1993 (coedited with Priscelina Patajo-Legasto)
 The Likhaan Book of Poetry and Fiction: 1995, 1996
 Shaking the Family Tree, 1998
 An Edith Tiempo Reader, 1999
 The Likhaan Book of Poetry and Fiction: 1997, 1999
 Pinay: Autobiographical Narratives by Women Writers, 1926-1998, 2000
 Why I Travel and Other Essays, 2000
 Sleepless in Manila: Essays on Insomnia by Insomniacs, 2003
 My Fair Maladies, 2005

Textbooks
 Creative Nonfiction: A Manual for Filipino Writers, 2003
 Creative Nonfiction: A Reader, 2003

Honors and awards
 Carlos Palanca Memorial Awards for Short Fiction, Essay and the Novel
 Philippine Graphic Awards for Fiction
 
 Focus Awards for Fiction
 National Book Awards from The Manila Critics' Circle
 British Council Fellowship to Cambridge
 U.P. President's Award for Outstanding Publication
 U.P. Gawad Chancellor for Artist of the Year
 U.P. Gawad Chancellor for Outstanding Teacher (Professor Level)
 Ellen F. Fajardo Foundation Grant for Excellence in Teaching
 Outstanding Thomasian Writer Award
 U.P. Gawad Chancellor Hall of Fame Award
 U.P. System International Publication Awards
 Henry Lee Irwin Professorial Chair in Creative Writing, Ateneo de Manila University

External links
 University of the Philippines Institute of Creative Writing
 "Second Thoughts", Manuel Viloria's website on Philippine literature, culture and society
 New Officials, University of the Philippines
 Gawad Haydee Yorac
 UP ICW Website of Gawad Balagtas Recipients
 
 
 PALH Books
 University of Nueva Caceres, Naga City
 The Paz Marquez-Benitez Lectures, Ateneo de Manila University
 Philippines: Women's Studies Bibliography, University of California, Berkeley
 Philippines 2004, UCLA Library
 University of Hawaii at Manoa Library
 The Country's Literary Produce for 2000 by Bienvenido Lumbera
 Your Portal to Philippine Literature
 National Book Development Board
 The Literary Encyclopedia
 World Literature Today 9WLT}
 Modern Literature of Southeast Asia
 Tulikärpänen filippiiniläisiä novelleja
  忘れられた地での5年間：ビルマノート
 University of California at Los Angeles

Filipino writers
University of Santo Tomas alumni
1944 births
Living people
English-language writers from the Philippines
University of the Philippines Diliman alumni
Palanca Award recipients